The Academy of Fine Arts at Umeå University is a Swedish art school.  It was founded in 1987 in a former factory by the river of Uman. Every year 12 new students are accepted to the school, and a total of 60 students currently study at the academy. The school is part of the Umeå Arts Campus.

See also

Royal University College of Fine Arts
Umeå University
Umeå Institute of Design
Umeå Institute of Technology
Umeå School of Architecture
Umeå School of Business

Art schools in Sweden
Umeå University
University departments in Sweden